Ethylenetetracarboxylic dianhydride is a chemical compound with formula , that can be seen as the twofold anhydride of ethylenetetracarboxylic acid .  It has a bicyclic molecular structure consisting of two maleic anhydride rings fused by their respective alkene units.  It is a pale yellow oily liquid, soluble in dichloromethane and chloroform.

The compound and its reactions were first reported in 1967. More recently developed reactions for its synthesis include pyrolysis of ethylenetetracarboxylic acid

and microwave pyrolysis of solid Meldrum's acid. In this latter route, two molecules of the Meldrum's acid are believed to undergo a reductive dimerization to give an alkene linkage with one "Meldrum's acid" ring on each end. The rings then open via hydrolysis of the esters to form ethylenetetracarboxylic acid, and then the carboxylic acid units recyclize with different partners (cis on each side of the alkene) as in the simple pyrolysis of the tetra-acid.

See also
Cyclohexanehexone, an elusive isomer.

References

Carboxylic anhydrides
Oxocarbons
Heterocyclic compounds with 2 rings
Oxygen heterocycles